Dichomeris chlorophracta is a moth in the family Gelechiidae. It was described by Edward Meyrick in 1921. It is found in Zimbabwe.

The wingspan is 12-17 mm. The forewings are dark violet fuscous with a moderate whitish-ochreous costal streak at the base extending to dorsum, at three-fourths with a triangular expansion where a narrow transverse fascia runs to the dorsum before the tornus, continued around the apical portion of the costa and termen to the dorsal end of the fascia as a slender streak dotted with dark fuscous. The hindwings are light grey.

References

Moths described in 1921
chlorophracta
Endemic fauna of Zimbabwe